Francis Pepper (July 1875 – 1914) was an English footballer. His regular position was at half back. He was born in Wortley, West Riding of Yorkshire (now in South Yorkshire). He played for Sheffield United, Newton Heath LYR, Barnsley, Doncaster Rovers and South Kirkby.

He died in Rotherham in 1914, at the age of 38.

References

External links
MUFCInfo.com profile

1875 births
1914 deaths
Footballers from Sheffield
English footballers
Sheffield United F.C. players
Manchester United F.C. players
Barnsley F.C. players
Doncaster Rovers F.C. players
South Kirkby Colliery F.C. players
Association football defenders